Shishu Niketan Higher Secondary School is an educational institution located in Ranirbazar, Jirania subdivision, in the West Tripura district of Tripura state in India. The school was established in 1984.

Description 
Fifty-two faculty members impart education to approximately 1356 children in this State Board school, with a student-teacher ratio of 26:1. Coursework is primarily conducted in the Bengali language.

References 
 https://schools.org.in/west-tripura/16011002106/shishu-niketan-hs-school.html

Schools in Tripura
Educational institutions established in 1984
1984 establishments in India